Varshnie Singh was the First Lady of Guyana from 1999 to 2007, she was the wife of Bharrat Jagdeo until their divorce in 2007.

References

First ladies of Guyana
Living people
Year of birth missing (living people)
Place of birth missing (living people)
21st-century Guyanese people
Guyanese people of Indian descent